Lake Diefenbaker is a reservoir and bifurcation lake in southern part of the Canadian province of Saskatchewan. It was formed by the construction of Gardiner Dam and the Qu'Appelle River Dam across the South Saskatchewan and Qu'Appelle Rivers respectively. Construction began in 1959 and the lake was filled in 1967. Lake Diefenbaker provides water for domestic irrigation and town water supplies. The flow of the two rivers is now regulated with a considerable portion of the South Saskatchewan diverted into the Qu'Appelle. Prior to the dams' construction, high water levels in the South Saskatchewan would frequently cause dangerous ice conditions downstream in Saskatoon while the Qu'Appelle would frequently dry up in the summer months.

Lake Diefenbaker is the largest body of water in southern Saskatchewan, although Last Mountain Lake is the largest naturally occurring one. The lake was named after John G. Diefenbaker, a former Prime Minister of Canada.

Recreation 

Three provincial parks and four regional parks are located on the shores of Lake Diefenbaker: Danielson Provincial Park, Douglas Provincial Park, Saskatchewan Landing Provincial Park, Palliser Regional Park, Outlook Regional Park, Cabri Regional Park, and Prairie Lake Regional Park.

Recreational activities include fishing, boating, and camping. The town of Elbow contains a marina for boat storage and house boat rental.

The only remaining ferry on the lake is the Riverhurst Ferry, a cable ferry that operates across Lake Diefenbaker near Riverhurst, Saskatchewan.

Ecology 
Lake Diefenbaker is home to 26 native and stocked fish species. These include burbot, walleye, northern pike, lake whitefish, lake trout, sauger, goldeye, cisco, yellow perch, rainbow trout, lake sturgeon, longnose sucker, white sucker, shorthead redhorse and Atlantic Salmon. Both the current world-record rainbow trout and world-record burbot were caught in the lake. The lake itself along with Battle Creek are the only two bodies of water in Saskatchewan that support a reproducing population of rainbow trout.

The lake's sandy beaches provide appropriate habitat for the nationally endangered piping plover.

The long stretches of open water and poorly consolidated shore materials makes the shores vulnerable to erosion. Between 1968 and 1992 bank recession rates have commonly ranged up to  a year with higher rates in exposed areas.

Important Bird Areas 
There two Important Bird Areas (IBA) of Canada on Lake Diefenbaker, with one at each end.

Geese found in Miry and Galloway Bays include the greater white-fronted, snow, and Ross's. Sandhill cranes are also found at the site.

East Lake Diefenbaker (SK055) is located at the eastern end of the lake. It totals  and encompasses most of both the Gordon McKenzie and Thomson Arms of the lake. This IBA is designated as critical piping plover habitat.

See also 
List of lakes of Saskatchewan
List of dams and reservoirs in Canada
List of generating stations in Saskatchewan

References

External links 

Lake Diefenbaker Tourism Inc.
Water Management
 Encyclopedia of Saskatchewan
 Encyclopedia of Saskatchewan. Mistusinne.
Lake Diefenbaker Depth / Bathymetric Map

Lakes of Saskatchewan
Reservoirs in Canada
John Diefenbaker
Bifurcation lakes
Important Bird Areas of Saskatchewan
South Saskatchewan River